Barry Daniel Wallace (17 April 1959 – 17 October 2006) was an English football midfielder who played professionally in the Football League, North American Soccer League and Major Indoor Soccer League. After his retirement from playing, Wallace spent the rest of his life coaching youth soccer teams.

Playing career
In 1975, Wallace signed with Queens Park Rangers at the age of sixteen. He spent two seasons in the QPR youth system before graduating to the first team in 1977. He played twenty-five first team games over three seasons. In 1980, he moved to the United States to sign with the Tulsa Roughnecks of the North American Soccer League. He remained with the Roughnecks until traded to the Minnesota Strikers during the 1984 season. Wallace was named to four all-NASL teams, including the 1983 Best XI. In Soccer Bowl '83 he assisted on the game-winning goal by Njego Pesa. He finished the 1984 outdoor season with the Strikers, then began the 1984–1985 indoor season in Minnesota before being sent to the Wichita Wings in January 1985. On 20 October 1987, Wallace signed as a free agent with the Kansas City Comets. In June 1988, Wallace returned to outdoor soccer with the Fort Lauderdale Strikers of the American Soccer League. He rejoined the Comets as a free agent in January 1989. In June 1989, he moved to the Tulsa Renegades of the Southwest Outdoor Soccer League. At the time, Wallace lived in Tulsa. In July 1989, Wallace signed as a free agent with the Tacoma Stars of MISL. He joined the team at the end of the SOSL playoffs in August. On 23 December 1989, the Stars traded Wallace to the Kansas City Comets in exchange for Kia and Gerry Gray. The Comets released Wallace at the end of the season. In January 1991, he signed with the Tulsa Renegades which were in the midst of the 1990–91 Sunbelt Independent Soccer League season. In December 1991, he moved to the Tulsa Ambush of the National Professional Soccer League. In 1993, he played for the Tulsa Roughnecks in the USISL. In December 1994, the Wichita Wings signed Wallace to a short-term contract after the team was decimated by injuries. In 1995, he returned to the Tulsa Roughnecks. He finished his professional career with the Roughnecks during the 1996 USISL outdoor season.

Personal life and death
Wallace was born in London in 1959 to James and Violet Wallace. He had one brother four sisters. In early September 2006 Wallace learned he had terminal cancer and died in Kansas in mid-October. He left behind his wife Krisiti, son Daniel, daughter Sophie, and step-daughters Stephanie, Stacie and Sydnie.

References

External links
NASL/MISL stats

Tulsa National Soccer Club obituary

1959 births
2006 deaths
American Soccer League (1988–89) players
English footballers
English expatriate footballers
Fort Lauderdale Strikers (1988–1994) players
Kansas City Comets (original MISL) players
Major Indoor Soccer League (1978–1992) players
Minnesota Strikers (NASL) players
North American Soccer League (1968–1984) indoor players
National Professional Soccer League (1984–2001) players
North American Soccer League (1968–1984) players
Queens Park Rangers F.C. players
Tacoma Stars players
Tulsa Ambush players
Tulsa Renegades players
Tulsa Roughnecks (1978–1984) players
Tulsa Roughnecks (1993–2000) players
USISL players
Wichita Wings (MISL) players
Wichita Wings (NPSL) players
Minnesota Strikers (MISL) players
Association football defenders
English expatriate sportspeople in the United States
Expatriate soccer players in the United States